Selenicereus, sometimes known as moonlight cactus, is a genus of epiphytic, lithophytic, and terrestrial cacti, found in Mexico, Central America, the Caribbean and northern South America. The term night-blooming cereus is also sometimes used, but this is also used for many night-blooming cacti, including Epiphyllum and Peniocereus. In 2017, the genus Hylocereus was brought into synonymy with Selenicereus. A number of species of Selenicereus produce fruit that is eaten. The fruit, known as pitaya or pitahaya in Spanish or as dragon fruit, may be collected from the wild or the plants may be cultivated.

Description
Clambering plants with flat to angled stems, producing aerial roots. Areoles may be with or without spines. Flowers are large and nocturnal, pollinated by moths or rarely bats. The receptacle bears small bracts, hairs and usually spines. Fruits bear  numerous spines.  Flowers are generally produced in abundance with mature plants and are typically white and are very fragrant and only last a single night in most species.

Taxonomy
The taxon was first described as a section, Cereus sect. Selinicereus, by Alwin Berger in 1905. It was raised to a genus by Britton and Rose in 1909. The name is derived from Σελήνη (Selene), the Greek moon goddess, referring to the nocturnal flowers, and cereus, meaning "candle" in Latin, a name used for upright cacti. A molecular phylogenetic study of the tribe Hylocereeae in 2017 showed that the genus Hylocereus was nested within Selenicereus, so all the species of Hylocereus were transferred to Selenicereus. , the transfer was accepted by Plants of the World Online. The authors of the 2017 study also placed some species of Weberocereus within Selenicereus, which was not accepted by Plants of the World Online .

Phylogeny
The cladogram below shows the relationships found in the 2017 study of the tribe Hylocereeae.

Selenicereus belongs to the hylocereoid clade, along with Weberocereus. Members of the clade are mostly climbing or epiphytic, and have spiny ribbed stems, contrasting with members of the phyllocactoid clade, which are mainly epiphytic, and have spineless flattened leaf-like stems.

Species
Species placed in the genus by Korotkova et al. in 2017 are listed below. The list includes three species formerly placed in Weberocereus, whose transfer was not accepted by Plants of the World Online .

{| class="wikitable sortable" style="text-align: left; width: 75%;"
|-
! Species
! Description
! Distribution
! Flower
! Fruit
|-
| Selenicereus anthonyanus(Alexander) D.R.Hunt
|  Stems like those of Epiphyllum anguliger but more vining and with short spines. Flowers ca. 12 cm long, 10–15 cm wide, the outer inner tepals purplish, the inner cream.
|Mexico.
|
|
|-
| Selenicereus alliodorus(Gómez-Hin. & H.M.Hern.) S. Arias & Korotkova(syn. Weberocereus alliodorus)
|
|Southwest Mexico
|
|
|-
| Selenicereus atropilosusKimnach
|Flowers 12 cm long, receptacle with black hairs. The species is close to some species in the genus Weberocereus.
| Mexico. 
|
|
|-
| Selenicereus calcaratus(F.A.C.Weber) D.R.Hunt
|
| Costa Rica
|
|
|-
| Selenicereus costaricensis(F.A.C.Weber) S. Arias & Korotkova
|Stems waxy-white without horny margins. Flowers ca. 30 cm long with large bracts, usually with purple margins. Fruit red with purple pulp.
|Costa Rica, Nicaragua and Panama. 
|
|
|-
| Selenicereus dorschianusRalf Bauer
|
| Mexico
|
|
|-
| Selenicereus escuintlensis(Kimnach) D.R.Hunt
|Stems green not glaucous, brown-margined. Flowers 28–31 cm long, 24–36 cm wide.
| Guatemala, Mexico and Nicaragua
|
|
|-
| Selenicereus extensus(Salm-Dyck ex DC.) Leuenb.
|
| French Guiana, Guyana and Suriname
|
|
|-
| Selenicereus glaber(Eichlam) S. Arias & Korotkova(syn. Weberocereus glaber)
|
|El Salvador, Guatemala and Honduras
|
|
|-
| Selenicereus grandiflorus(L.) Britton & Rose'|Stems many-ribbed. Flowers 18 cm long, receptacle densely woolly. Three subspecies are recognized:
ssp. grandiflorusssp. donkelaarii - Mexico. Stems 1 cm thick, low-ribbed, spines short, appressed to stem. Flowers 18 cm long.
ssp. hondurensis- Honduras? Stem ribs tubercled. Flowers 30–34 cm long.
| The Bahamas, the Cayman Islands, Cuba, the Dominican Republic, Guatemala, Haiti, Jamaica, Mexico and Nicaragua. 
|
|
|-
| Selenicereus guatemalensis(Eichlam ex Weing.) D.R.Hunt
|
| Guatemala
|
|
|-
| Selenicereus hamatus(Scheidw.) Britton & Rose
|Stems 3-4-ribbed, with knobby projections, nearly spineless. Flowers 20–25 cm long, receptacle with black hairs.
| Mexico. 
|
|
|-
| Selenicereus inermis(Otto) Britton & Rose
|Stems 2-5-ribbed, almost spineless. Flower 15 cm long, spiny, hairless.
| Colombia, Costa Rica, Mexico, Panamá and Venezuela. 
|
|
|-
| Selenicereus megalanthus(K.Schum. ex Vaupel) Moran
|Stems green, slender without horny margins. Flowers 30–38 cm long with large flattened tubercles and small bracts. Fruit yellow.
| Colombia, Ecuador and Peru
|
|
|-
| Selenicereus minutiflorus(Britton & Rose) D.R.Hunt
|Stems green. Flowers with rigid spines at base of flower, 5 cm long, 8–9 cm wide, white.
| Belize, Guatemala and Honduras
|
|
|-
| Selenicereus monacanthus(Lem.) D.R.Hunt(syn. incl. H. lemairei, H. monacanthus)
|Stems gray-green without horny margins. Flowers ca 30 cm long, petals white, tinged pinkish near base or entirely pink. Tube with distant bracts. Stigma lobes usually forked. Fruit red with purple pulp.
| Colombia, Costa Rica, Ecuador, Nicaragua, Panamá, Peru, Trinidad and Tobago, Venezuela and the Venezuelan Antilles
|
|
|-
| Selenicereus murrilliiBritton & Rose
|Stems only 8 mm thick, nearly spineless. Flowers 15 cm long, spiny, hairless. Closely related to S. spinulous and S. inermis (sensu lat.).
|Mexico. 
|
|
|-
| Selenicereus nelsonii(Weing.) Britton & Rose
|Flowers 20 cm long, receptacle hairless, spiny. Possibly conspecific with S. vagans.
|Mexico. 
|
|
|-
| Selenicereus ocamponis(Salm-Dyck) D.R.Hunt(syn. incl. H. guatemalense, H. purpursii, H. ocamponis)
|Stems white-waxy, margins horny, spines needle-like, to 12 mm long. Flowers 25–32 cm long with white inner petals. Bracts overlapping, with purple margins.
| Mexico
|
|
|-
| Selenicereus pteranthus(Link ex A.Dietr.) Britton & Rose
|Two forms are recognized:
f. macdonaldiae - Honduras? Stem ribs tubercled. Flowers 30–34 cm long.
f. pteranthus - Mexico. Stems thick, 4-5-ribbed, spines very short. Flowers 25–30 cm long.
|The Bahamas, Belize, the Cayman Islands, Cuba, the Dominican Republic and Mexico. 
|
|
|-
| Selenicereus purpusii(Weing.) Arias & Korotkova
|
| Mexico
|
|
|-
| Selenicereus setaceus(Salm-Dyck ex DC.) A.Berger ex Werderm.
|Stems green without horny margins, rather spiny. Flowers 19–22 cm with small tubercles and bracts. Fruit red.
| Argentina, Bolivia, Brazil and Paraguay
|
|
|-
| Selenicereus spinulosus(DC.) Britton & Rose
|
|Texas, Mexico. Stems short-spined. Flowers 8–14 cm long, receptacle spiny, hairless.
|
|
|-
| Selenicereus stenopterus(F.A.C.Weber) D.R.Hunt
|Stems thin, soft, green. Flowers 9–10 cm long, 13–15 cm wide, tube short, tepals purplish red.
| Costa Rica
|
|
|-
| Selenicereus tonduzii(F.A.C.Weber) S. Arias & Korotkova(syn. Weberocereus tonduzii)
|
|Costa Rica and Panama
|
|
|-
| Selenicereus triangularis(L.) D.R.Hunt
|Stems green without horny margins, slender. Flowers ca. 20 cm long, base with wide overlapping scales
| Cuba, the Dominican Republic, Haiti, the Leeward Islands, Puerto Rico and the Windward Islands
|
|
|-
| Selenicereus tricaeD.R.Hunt
|
| Belize, Guatemala and Mexico
|
|
|-
| Selenicereus trigonus(Haw.) S. Arias & Korotkova
|Stems green without horny margins. Flowers ca. 22 cm long, 21 cm wide, base with small, narrow, widely spaced scales, sometimes spiny. Fruit red. May be a synonym of Selenicereus triangularis| the Caribbean.
|
|-
| Selenicereus undatus(Haw.) D.R.Hunt
|Stems green, margins undulate and horny. Flowers 25–30 cm long, white with green outer tepals and bracts. Fruit red with white pulp.
| El Salvador, Guatemala, Honduras and Mexico
|
|
|-
| Selenicereus vagans(K.Brandegee) Britton & Rose
|Flower 15 cm long, receptacle spiny, hairless.
|Mexico. 
|
|
|-
| Selenicereus validusS.Arias & U.Guzmán
|Huge nocturnal flowers with bright red fruits.
| Mexico (Michoacán). 
|
|
|}

Species formerly recognized include:Selenicereus boeckmannii – synonym of Selenicereus pteranthusSelenicereus brevispinus – synonym of Selenicereus pteranthusSelenicereus chontalensis – synonym of Deamia chontalensisSelenicereus coniflorus – synonym of Selenicereus grandiflorusSelenicereus hallensis – synonym of Selenicereus grandiflorusSelenicereus urbanianus – synonym of Selenicereus grandiflorusSelenicereus rubineus – synonym of Selenicereus inermisSelenicereus wercklei – synonym of Selenicereus inermisSelenicereus wittii – synonym of Strophocactus wittiiUses

The fruits of a number of species of Selenicereus (particularly those formerly placed in Hylocereus) are eaten. Selenicereus undatus and Selenicereus triangularis are widely cultivated in the Americas, Europe and Asia for their fruits, known as pitayas or pitahayas in Spanish, and as dragon fruits in Asia. The fruit of Selenicereus setaceus'' is eaten in South America.

References

External links

 
Cacti of North America
Cacti of South America
Flora of the Caribbean
Flora of Central America
Night-blooming plants